Phortse is a village located at 3840m in Khumbu, Nepal.

It is off the main trekking circuit and therefore more resembles an authentic Sherpa village. There is a high trail connection to Pangpoche offering splendid views across the valley, which can be used instead of the standard Tengboche route.

References

Solukhumbu District